Abantis venosa, the veined skipper or veined paradise skipper, is a butterfly of the family Hesperiidae. It is found in Zululand, Eswatini, Transvaal, Zimbabwe, Kenya and Uganda.

The wingspan is 36–41 mm for males and 35–45 mm for females. Adults are on wing year-round with peaks in late summer from February to April and in spring from August to November.

The larvae feed on Pterocarpus rotundifolius and Pterocarpus brenanii.

References

Butterflies described in 1889
Tagiadini
Butterflies of Africa
Taxa named by Roland Trimen